Adam James Leathers (born 14 November 2001) is an English professional footballer who plays as a midfielder for Maidenhead United on loan from Wycombe Wanderers.

Career
Leathers began his career with Leicester City as a youth player, where he was a regular in the Under-18 Premier League. His first senior match came on 10 November 2020 against Grimsby Town in the EFL Trophy. At the end of the 2021–22 season, Leathers was released by the club.

Leathers joined Wycombe Wanderers in September 2021. He made his professional debut on 9 November 2021 in a 5–0 loss against Burton Albion in the EFL Trophy first round. In January 2022, he moved on loan to Dulwich Hamlet. On 18 November 2022, Leathers joined National League South side Hampton & Richmond Borough on a 28-day loan deal. On 31 January 2023, he joined National League club Maidenhead United until the end of the season on loan.

Career statistics

References

External links

2001 births
Living people
English footballers
Association football midfielders
Leicester City F.C. players
Wycombe Wanderers F.C. players
Dulwich Hamlet F.C. players
Hampton & Richmond Borough F.C. players
Maidenhead United F.C. players
English Football League players
National League (English football) players